Robert L. Mason was an athlete, coach and official from Burns, Wyoming, who was inducted into the Washington Wrestling Hall of Fame in 1996. He died on March 18, 2000, at the age of 70.

References

External links
https://gowyo.com/story.aspx?filename=general-uw-intercollegiate-athletics-hall-of-fame-selects-class-of-2019&file_date=3/2/2019

Year of birth missing
2000 deaths
American wrestlers
Sports coaches from Wyoming